The Parona leatherjacket (Parona signata) is a species of carangid found along the Atlantic coast of South America from southern Brazil to southern Argentina and the Falkland Islands.  This species grows to a length of  TL and is of minor importance to local commercial fisheries.  This species is the only known member of its genus.

References

Scomberoidinae